Saurita trichopteraeformis is a moth in the subfamily Arctiinae. It was described by Peter Jörgensen in 1913. It is found in Argentina.

References

Moths described in 1913
Saurita